Globocassidulina elegans is a species of foraminifera. It is a marine species found in the Japanese and New Zealand Exclusive Economic Zones.

References

External links 
 
 Globocassidulina elegans at the Worls Register of Marine Species (WoRMS)

Rotaliida
Species described in 1910